Mike Fedorko (born September 13, 1956, in Hamilton, Ontario) is a former professional ice hockey player who played four games with the Houston Aeros of the World Hockey Association in 1977.  Previously, he played three seasons with the Hamilton Fincups in the Ontario Hockey Association, and was a part of the Memorial Cup winning team in 1976.  After retiring as a player he spent several years as a head coach in the Western and Ontario Hockey League Hockey Leagues, serving with the Prince Albert Raiders, Spokane Chiefs and London Knights

International career
Fedorko played in The Netherlands from 1978 to 1981 for top flight team Roswell Nijmegen 106 matches prior to starting his coaching career in Rotterdam. In Rotterdam Mike Fedorko coached The Panda's from 1986 until 1991 winning the Dutch Pro League Championship.

References

External links

1956 births
Canadian ice hockey coaches
Canadian ice hockey defencemen
Flint Generals players
Fort Wayne Komets players
Hamilton Fincups players
Hamilton Red Wings (OHA) players
Houston Aeros draft picks
Houston Aeros (WHA) players
Ice hockey people from Ontario
Kalamazoo Wings (1974–2000) players
Living people
London Knights coaches
Minnesota North Stars draft picks
Nijmegen Devils players
Oklahoma City Blazers (1965–1977) players
Prince Albert Raiders coaches
Sportspeople from Hamilton, Ontario